Lydia Lozano Hernández (born 12 December 1960) is a Spanish journalist and television personality associated with the Mediaset España group.

Biography 
Born in Madrid, Lozano's family is from El Paso, on the Canary Island of La Palma. After she graduated from Complutense University of Madrid in 1982 with a degree in journalism, she briefly worked as a salesperson at El Corte Inglés before being hired by Radio Nacional de España and other radio channels, such as COPE and Antena 3 Radio.

Tómbola 
Lozano rose to prominence on the show Tómbola. The show aired on several Spanish-language channels between 1997 and 2004, including Channel Nou, which produced the show, and Telemadrid. The show's format featured a group of talk show hosts, including Lozano, Karmele, Jesús Mariñas and others, who interviewed guests about their personal lives. Although the program was sometimes criticized, it was popular with audiences and remained on the air for over a decade.

Atresmedia and Mediaset 
The success of Tómbola prompted several private television channels, in particular Telecinco and Antena 3, to copy the format and incorporate it into their respective schedules, sometimes making it the backbone of their programming. They also hired journalists such as Lozano, who until then worked for regional television channels. Lozano began to appear in front of  camera, first on Antena 3 and then on Telecinco on the program A tu lado, hosted by Emma García. Lozano co-hosted A tu lado from 2003 until its cancellation in 2007.

Lozano's unique style of journalism drew viewers and boosted ratings, which made her one of the most regular faces of the channel. She appeared on talk shows such as Gran Hermano (2004–2008), Gran Hermano VIP: El desafío (2004–2005), Salsa Rosa (2004–2005), La casa de tu vida (2004–2005), TNT (2006–2007), El ventilador (2007–2008), La Noria (2008–2012), and Abre los ojos... y mira (2013–2014). Since 2009, she has been featured on Sálvame and Deluxe.

In addition to serving as a collaborator, she has participated as a contestant in the diving talent show ¡Mira quién salta! in 2013 and appeared on Killer Karaoke. She also took part in Todo va bien, an access program on Cuatro, in which she was the subject of a hidden camera prank.

In 2015 and 2016, she participated in debates for the shows Supervivientes and Pasaporte a la isla, serving as a member of the jury for the latter. In 2016 and 2017, she co-hosted GH VIP 4: Límite 48 Horas, GH 17: El Debate, GH VIP 5: Límite 48 Horas, and Supervivientes: Conexión Honduras. She later worked on Gran Hermano Revolution: Ultima Hora.

On 20 November 2017, she was chosen by the public to host Campanadas de fin de Año 2017–2018, sharing hosting duties with four other Sálvame colleagues who were chosen by the program's management (María Patiño, Terelu Campos, Mila Ximénez and Kiko Hernández). That same night, she and her colleagues were part of the year's special, Sálvame Stars.

In 2018 she was a guest on Telemadrid's Aquí hay madroño (later, El madroño) and began to collaborate on Radiolé's Valderrama y Olé. That year, she received the Aquí Televisión award for best collaborator, sharing the nomination with Eduardo Inda and Jesús Cintora.

In 2019 the program Sálvame celebrated its 10th anniversary by airing Sálvame Okupa, a fusion of two of its star programs, which featured Lozano and other hosts from the show's history. Lozano placed second in the competition behind Víctor Sandoval.

Lozano hosted Sábado Deluxe during the interview with Belén Esteban and occasionally also presents Sálvame Limón from 16:00 to 17:00.

In 2021, she was portrayed by Lala Chús in the Atresplayer Premium television series Veneno directed by Javier Ambrossi and Javier Calvo. The same year, she won the Aquí Televisión awards as best collaborator, sharing the category with Terelu Campos,Tamara Falcó and Valeria Vegas.

Controversies 
In September 2001, an investigative report was aired entitled La gran mentira del corazón, produced by Melchor Miralles for El Mundo TV. César Sicre was hired for the report as an unknown actor who made people believe that he had had an affair with Mexican singer Paulina Rubio. Lozano mistakenly presented the erroneous claim as fact on a television broadcast.

Another controversy involved the case of Ylenia Carrisi, the daughter of singers Al Bano and Romina Power, who disappeared in New Orleans in 1994. For months in 2005, Lozano shared the news that Ylenia was still alive, leading the young woman's father to file a lawsuit against Lozano. Lozano was forced to make a public apology. The Complaints and Ethics Commission of the Federation of Press Associations reviewed her case and found that Lozano "lacked journalistic commitment by not telling the truth."

Personal life 
Lozano has two older siblings, Jorge and Esther. She has been married since June 22, 1990, to architect Carlos "Charlie" Garca-San Miguel Rodríguez de Partearroyo. On June 20, 2015, Lozano and her husband marked their 25th wedding anniversary by renewing their marriage vows. Her brother passed away due to COVID-19 in March 2021.

Awards 

 The Best Shoe Woman in Spain 2011, granted by the Shoe Museum of Elda.

Credits

Television collaborator

Contests and reality shows

Guest appearances

Films

Television series

References 

Gran Hermano (Spanish TV series)
Spanish television journalists
Spanish women journalists
Living people
1960 births